Canadian Forces Base Shilo (CFB Shilo) is an operations and training base of the Canadian Armed Forces, located  east of Brandon, Manitoba and adjacent to Sprucewoods. During the 1990s, Canadian Forces Base Shilo was also designated as an Area Support Unit, which acts as a local base of operations for south-west Manitoba in times of military and civil emergency.

It is located at the very southwest corner of the Municipality of North Cypress – Langford, and the very northwest corner of the Municipality of Glenboro – South Cypress. Additionally, it lies adjacent to the eastern border of the Rural Municipality of Cornwallis.  The base has an 18-hole golf course. The course hosts numerous military and civilian golf events.

History and demographics 

CFB Shilo has been a training facility for the Canadian Army since 1910, and saw an increase in its use as a training facility following the outbreak of World War I. The base is also home to the Royal Canadian Artillery Museum and many artillery pieces are on display including a cannon used at the North-West Rebellion.

The principal purpose of this base is for training in artillery and  munitions, activities audibly recognized, though not begrudged, by generations of nearby residents. In 1942, training of the 1st Canadian Parachute Battalion was transferred here from Fort Benning, Georgia and RAF Ringway in the United Kingdom. The existence of the base has enhanced the economic stability of the surrounding area through contracted employment with the Department of National Defence, and provision of off-base services to staff and trainees. CFB Shilo provides employment for approximately 1,400 military personnel, as well as an additional estimated 450 civilian personnel. The base is located within the federal electoral district of Brandon—Souris.

Geographic/geological significance 

The landscape in this area is particularly well suited to these operations. The rolling hills are well suited to hidden target firing drills. Soil compositions of loose sand/gravel aggregates are also ideal for artillery and munitions training. The lack of surface bedrock outcropping greatly reduces the chances of hazardous ricochets during live-fire exercises and also assists in the safe retrieval and secure disposal of both detonated and un-detonated ordnance.

Units 
CFB Shilo is the home to the following operational units:

1st Regiment, Royal Canadian Horse Artillery
2nd Battalion, Princess Patricia's Canadian Light Infantry

It hosts the following detachments supporting 3rd Canadian Division:

3rd Canadian Division Training Centre, "C" Company Shilo
1 Military Police Regiment, detachment Shilo.
11 CF Health Services Centre
3rd Canadian Division Support Group Signal Squadron, detachment Shilo

External connections/partnerships 

Throughout the years both Regular Forces and Primary Reserve troops have trained at CFB Shilo. Troops from other countries, such as Germany, France, Denmark and the United States, have used the area for training. In particular the German Army Training Establishment Shilo has, from 1974 to 2000, trained in excess of 140,000 troops.

CFB Shilo has also seen use by Royal Canadian Mounted Police officers and employees of the Manitoba Department of Corrections.

Transportation

There were two heliports associated with the base.

Royal Canadian Artillery Museum 
The Royal Canadian Artillery Museum is the only museum in the world that explores the history of Canadian gunners who served Canada since 1855. Established in 1962 at CFB Shilo and provides a national portrait of Canadian gunnery. It includes more than 65,000 artifacts, including more than 150 artillery pieces and vehicles.

Financial information 

CFB Shilo expends $105 million yearly in salaries and purchases, has 1,350 military people and employs 350 civilians. Having a population of 1,700 people

References

External links 
Department of National Defence - CFB Shilo
The Royal Canadian Artillery Museum - CFB Shilo
CFB Shilo presentation — CAF Connection

Shilo
Defunct airports in Manitoba